The Minor Basilica of La Purísima Concepción, locally known as Santa Maria Church (Filipino: Basilika Minor ng La Purisima Concepcion) (Spanish: Basilica Menor de la Purísima Concepción) is a Roman Catholic Church located in the municipality of Santa Maria, in the province of Bulacan, Philippines. It is under the coat of arms and jurisdiction of the Roman Catholic Bishop of Malolos and Seat of the Episcopal Vicar of the Eastern District of the Diocese of Malolos. It was declared by Pope Francis on March 21, 2021 that the parish will be elevated into a Minor Basilica. On November 27, 2021, the church was formally declared as a Minor Basilica which was headed by Charles Brown, the apostolic nuncio to the Philippines.

Early history

Santa Maria Church was founded by Franciscan Friars as a visita by the priest Francisco Javier under the parish of Saint Martin of Tours in Bocaue. The materials was initially made of cogon and bamboo and later stronger materials. Then by 1792, Santa Maria de Pandi gained independence from its matrix and the construction of a bigger church commenced. The church was renamed Parroquia de la Purísima Concepción dedicated to the Virgin Mary.

Image of La Purísima Concepción

The church is home to  an image of the Virgin Mary that is believed to be miraculous. There are two local legends as to how the image arrived in Santa Maria: first is that it was brought to the town by the Franciscan Friars, second is that it was sculpted out of wood from a galleon. The image has been stolen in the 1930s and was retrieved in Nueva Ecija by a man named Teofilo Ramirez who claimed that the Virgin Mary appeared in his dream and gave instructions as to where the image can be found. The image was returned to the town on a February and the townsfolk accordingly adjusted their feast day to the first Thursday of February except when its falls on February 2 (the feast of the Our Lady of the Candles). The image was first granted an episcopal coronation on March 3, 2018 by Bishop Jose Oliveros of Malolos. On March 28, 2019, Pope Francis granted the canonical coronation of the image of La Purisima Concepcion. The coronation took place on February 1, 2020.

References

External links
 

Roman Catholic churches in Bulacan
Santa Maria, Bulacan
Purisima
Churches in the Roman Catholic Diocese of Malolos